Mount Marathon, or officially Marathon Mountain, is a  mountain summit directly west of Seward in the Kenai Mountains in the U.S. state of Alaska. The namesake of the mountain is the Mount Marathon Race held every Fourth of July.

Climate

Based on the Köppen climate classification, Mount Marathon is located in a subarctic climate zone with long, cold, snowy winters, and mild summers. Temperatures can drop below −20 °C with wind chill factors below −30 °C. This climate supports a spruce and hemlock forest on the lower slopes. The months May and June offer the most favorable weather for viewing.

See also

List of mountain peaks of Alaska
Geology of Alaska

References

External links
 Marathon Mountain Weather forecast
 Official race page

Mountains of Kenai Peninsula Borough, Alaska
Mountains of Alaska